tert-Butyl chloride is the organochloride with the formula .  It is a colorless, flammable liquid. It is sparingly soluble in water, with a tendency to undergo hydrolysis to the corresponding tert-butyl alcohol.  It is produced industrially as a precursor to other organic compounds.

Synthesis 
tert-Butyl chloride is produced by the reaction of tert-butyl alcohol with hydrogen chloride. In the laboratory, concentrated hydrochloric acid is used. The conversion entails a SN1 reaction as shown below.

The overall reaction, therefore, is:

Because tert-butanol is a tertiary alcohol, the relative stability of the tert-butyl carbocation in the step 2 allows the SN1 mechanism to be followed, whereas a primary alcohol would follow an SN2 mechanism.

Reactions
When tert-butyl chloride is dissolved in water, it undergoes a hydrolysis to tert-butyl alcohol.  When dissolved in alcohols, the corresponding t-butyl ethers are produced.

Uses
tert-Butyl chloride is used to prepare the antioxidant tert-butylphenol and the fragrance neohexyl chloride.

See also 
 Isobutane

References

External links 
 Safety MSDS data
 Preparation 2-chloro-2-methylpropane
 http://www.cerlabs.com/experiments/10875407331.pdf

Chloroalkanes
Tert-butyl compounds